King of the Centre Forwards (German:Der König der Mittelstürmer) is a 1927 German silent sports film directed by Fritz Freisler and starring Paul Richter, Fritz Alberti and Colette Brettel.

The film's sets were designed by Bruno Lutz and Franz Seemann.

Cast
 Paul Richter as Tull Harper - ein Fussballspieler  
 Fritz Alberti as Konsul Harper - Tulls Vater  
 Colette Brettel as Margit Harper - seine Tochter  
 Aud Egede-Nissen as Miss Mabel Douglas  
 Rudolf Lettinger as Jakob Meeling  
 Carl Walther Meyer as Claus Meeling, sein Sohn  
 Teddy Bill as Mr. Jonas  
 Gustav Trautschold

References

Bibliography
 Kaes, Anton. Shell Shock Cinema: Weimar Culture and the Wounds of War. Princeton University Press, 2009.

External links

1927 films
Films of the Weimar Republic
Films directed by Fritz Freisler
German silent feature films
German black-and-white films
1920s sports films
German association football films
Bavaria Film films
1920s German films
Silent sports films